Ledell Lee (July 31, 1965 – April 20, 2017) was an American man convicted and executed for the 1993 murder of his neighbor, Debra Reese. He was convicted in 1995, and the Arkansas Supreme Court affirmed the conviction in 1997, but numerous questions have been raised about the justice of his trial and post-conviction representation. Issues have included conflict of interest for the judge, inebriation of counsel, and ineffective defense counsel. A request to postpone the execution in order to test DNA on the murder weapon was denied by a circuit judge. After Lee's execution, it was proven that the DNA on the murder weapon belonged to another person, an unknown male.

Convictions 
Debra Reese (September 27, 1966 – February 9, 1993), 26 years old at the time of her death, was found dead in 1993 in her home in Jacksonville, Arkansas. She had been strangled and beaten with a small wooden bat her husband had given her for protection.

Several of Reese's neighbors said they saw Lee near the house and identified him to police. He was arrested less than an hour later, allegedly after spending $300 stolen from Reese.

Lee was charged with first-degree murder, a capital offense. He was alleged to have struck Debra Reese 36 times with a tire thumper. He was convicted of first-degree murder by the jury and sentenced to death on October 16, 1995.

Post-arrest rape convictions and prosecution 
After being charged in the murder of Reese, Lee became a suspect in other crimes. He was accused of three sexual assaults and convicted of two, the 1991 rape of a Jacksonville woman and the 1990 rape of a Jacksonville teenager.

He was also prosecuted for the November 1989 rape and murder of 22-year-old Christine Lewis, a mother, in November 1989. Lewis was abducted from her home. She was later raped, strangled, and eventually killed. Her body was found inside a closet at an abandoned home. Lee was tried in 1994; the jury could not reach a verdict. After Lee was convicted and sentenced to death for Reese's murder, county prosecutors decided against retrying him for the alleged murder of Lewis.

Death row 
Lee was placed on death row in 1995. During most of that time, he was kept in solitary confinement, with extremely limited social contact. This is customary for death row prisoners. Lee was interviewed by the BBC before his execution. He said, "my life on death row is like twilight zone".

Appeals 
Lee maintained his innocence until the time of his death. Before he was executed, Lee was working with his lawyers at the Innocence Project and ACLU to conduct DNA analysis on blood and hair evidence collected from the 1993 crime scene. It had never been previously tested in the case. The state of Arkansas denied the defense request to have the analysis done. Lee's counsel had argued that they should be allowed to locate crime scene evidence collected in 1993, including a single hair and a Converse shoe with a pinhead-sized spot of human blood on it, for modern DNA testing. They hoped testing could prove that another man had been at the crime scene, and that evidence did not match Lee's DNA.

Motions 
Lee had also filed a motion in federal court asking the court to reopen his federal case due to issues with his first counsel, particularly the failure of counsel to bring evidence of his intellectual disability. Lee wanted to present new evidence showing that he had fetal alcohol syndrome disorder, significant brain damage, and intellectual disability. Lee's family worked with him and his lawyers to try to prove his innocence. During the hearing, Lee's attorney Lee Short made the case that prior counsel in the Reese case failed Lee by not insisting on modern DNA testing of the items prior to that time. He said that Lee had contacted the Innocence Project in 1996, asking for them to take up his case, but was told they didn't have the staff or funding.

Controversy over judge's conflict of interest
According to the ACLU:

Additionally, Lee was tried by a judge who concealed his own conflict of interest: an affair with the assistant prosecutor, to whom the judge was later married. Mr. Lee's first state post-conviction counsel introduced the evidence of the affair by calling the judge's ex-wife, who testified about the affair after opposing the subpoena. That lawyer, however, was so intoxicated at the hearing that the state moved for him to be drug tested after he slurred, stumbled, and made incoherent arguments. The inebriated lawyer also represented Lee briefly in federal court, where he raised the important claim that Lee was ineligible for execution because of intellectual disability. Lee won new proceedings because of the lawyer's drunkenness, though his representation did not improve afterward. His next lawyers failed to introduce evidence of the affair, giving up one of many of Lee's important arguments, and never pursued his innocence or intellectual disability claims.

"This is a story of the judicial process gone totally wrong," Lee's lawyer said. "The kinds of attorney failures here: an affair with the presiding judge by the prosecutor, gross intoxication by defense counsel, and wild incompetence undermine our profession as a whole. Mr. Lee has never had the opportunity to have his case truly investigated, despite serious questions about guilt, and his intellectual disability."

Throughout the legal challenges, the family of Debra Reese hoped that the execution would go through as scheduled.

Execution 
Lee was the first person executed in Arkansas since Eric Nance was executed in November 2005. The years of suspension have been related to court challenges to the use of lethal injections, with opponents arguing this form violated the Constitution. In addition, Europe has prohibited export of one of the drugs needed for this method.

For his last meal, Lee chose to receive Holy Communion. He had no last words.

At 11:44 p.m., Lee was given the lethal injection. His eyes closed three minutes later and he did not appear to show signs of discomfort, according to Sean Murphy, a reporter with the Associated Press and one of three media witnesses.

Lethal injection controversy in Arkansas 
In April 2017, Arkansas planned to execute eight death row inmates including Ledell Lee, along with Don W. Davis, Stacey Johnson, Jack Harold Jones, Jason McGehee, Bruce Earl Ward, Kenneth Williams, and Marcel Williams, before the stocks of the sedative midazolam expired at the end of April. Because Europe has prohibited export of these drugs to the United States and the major manufacturer is there, states in the US have been struggling with supplies.

A federal judge initially issued an injunction preventing the executions, but the Arkansas Supreme Court overturned the ruling. The United States Supreme Court rejected a claim that the accelerated execution schedule was "cruel and unusual punishment" under the constitution. At one point in the evening of April 20, 2017, the United States Supreme Court briefly delayed the execution as it reviewed appeals. It voted 5–4 to allow the state to proceed with the execution. On April 20, 2017, at about 11:30p.m. CDT, the state of Arkansas was allowed to proceed with Lee's execution.

In his first vote since being appointed to the US Supreme Court, Justice Neil Gorsuch voted in favor of the execution. At 11:56p.m. CDT, four minutes prior to the expiration of his execution warrant, Ledell Lee was executed. About 30 minutes after the high court's ruling, Lee was pronounced dead.

"The governor knows the right thing was done tonight," said J.R. Davis, a spokesman for Arkansas Governor Asa Hutchinson, who scheduled the multiple executions. "Justice was carried out." The state has proceeded with executions in order to avoid the expiration of drugs used in lethal injections. On April 24, 2017, the state executed Jack Harold Jones and Marcel Williams, in the first double execution in the United States in 17 years.

Post-execution DNA testing 
In April 2021, new DNA testing found "unknown male" DNA on the murder weapon and bloody clothes found at the scene. However, the test also "found moderate support" that blood on Lee's left shoe could have belonged to Reese.

See also 
 Capital punishment in Arkansas
 List of people executed in Arkansas
 List of people executed in the United States in 2017

References 

1965 births
2017 deaths
1993 murders in the United States
21st-century executions by Arkansas
21st-century executions of American people
American people executed for murder
Executed African-American people
Male murderers
People convicted of murder by Arkansas
People executed by Arkansas by lethal injection
20th-century African-American people
21st-century African-American people